Khoury (or ), also transliterated as Khouri, is a Levantine surname that is common to Christians in the Middle East. The term Khoury means "priest" in Levantine Arabic. It derives from the Latin word curia. 

Although most popular amongst the population in Lebanon, where it is the most common surname, the name can also be found within Christian communities in Israel, Syria, Palestine, and Jordan. It is often given as a last name to a new priest or minister, replacing the old one and to the children of the married priest and their descendants. The Maronite Church, which is in full communion with the Roman Catholic Church, allows married men to become priests. 

It is common for a family to keep the Khoury surname for generations past the life of the priest. Catholic and Orthodox clergy (particularly Maronite Catholic, Greek Orthodox, Melkite Catholic and Syriac Orthodox) are the largest numbers of people with this name; all four rites having a married priesthood according to Catholic and Orthodox norms. Khoury/Khouri is uncommon as a given name. In the Eastern Christian Churches, "Khoury" or "El-Khoury" means Corepiscopos, which is an honorary rank above a priest.

Due to the Lebanese diaspora, which started in the late 19th century, the name has acquired different variants in different countries and is also uncommonly spelled as El Khouri, El Khoury, Elcure, Elkhori, Elkouri, Kouri, Couri, Koury, Coury, Kourie, Koory, Koorey, Kuri, Khuri, Khury, Kury, Xouri, Curi, Cury, Coorey, Courey, Korey, Kory, Corey, Chory, Correy and in Latin America as Xuri, Kure, Cure, Correa, Juri, Jury, Cura, Jure, Eljure, Aljure and Alcuri.

People

 Amin Khoury, founder of B/E Aerospace
 Callie Khouri, Lebanese American Academy Award winner for writing the film Thelma & Louise
 Ana Khouri (born 1981), Brazilian jewelry designer and sculptor
 Tiny Tim (musician), born Herbert Khaury, father was of Maronite Lebanese decent
 Carlos Cure, Lebanese Colombian Chairman of Bavaria Brewery, Colombia
 Al Coury, Lebanese American record company executive
 Humberto Curi, an Argentine-born Olympic boxer who competed in the middleweight class in the 1928 Summer Olympics in Amsterdam
 Fred Coury, drummer for American glam metal band Cinderella
 Augusto Cury, Lebanese Brazilian neuroscientist and best-selling writer, developed the Multifocal Theory
Andrée Saab Khoury, known as Andrée Chedid, French Lebanese poet and novelist
Brian Cury, founder and CEO of Earthcam
 Katheryn Curi, American racing cyclist
 Joanne Chory, Lebanese American molecular biologist and geneticist
 Clara Khoury, Israeli actress
 Elias James Corey, Lebanese American organic chemist, won the Nobel Prize in Chemistry in 1990
 Elias Khoury, Lebanese novelist, journalist, and academic
 Elias Khoury (lawyer), Israeli lawyer
 Elissa (Lebanese singer), Lebanese singer, full name Elissar Zakaria Khoury
 Emile Kuri, Lebanese Mexican Academy Award winner for Best Art Direction
 , Lebanese Mexican mathematician
 Fadlo R. Khuri, Former chair at Emory University School of Medicine
 Elizabeth Khuri, co-founder of social website Goodreads
 Philip Khuri Hitti, Historian and professor at Harvard University
 Yusuf Al-Khuri, ancient translator and mathematician
 Adam Kury, bassist for American rock band Candlebox
 Faris al-Khoury, Syrian politician, former Prime Minister of Syria
 Fuad Khuri, Lebanese anthropologist
 Fuad Jorge Jury, Lebanese Argentine film director, known as Leonardo Favio
 George Khoury (author), writer in the field of comic books
George Khoury, molecular biologist and chief of the molecular virology laboratory at the National Cancer Institute
Huguette Khoury, known as Hughette Caland, French Lebanese painter
Gui Khuri, Brazilian skateboarder, youngest person to win a gold medal at the X-Games
 Greg Kouri, Lebanese Canadian co-founder of Zip2.com and X.com and high tech angel investor
 Donald Kouri, American physicist
 Giselle Khoury, Lebanese journalist and talk show host on BBC Arabic
 Ignatius Jacob I, Syriac Orthodox Patriarch of Antioch
 Joelle Khoury, Lebanese pianist, jazz and contemporary classical music composer
 Jowy Khoury, Lebanese actress
 Joyce El-Khoury, Lebanese-Canadian operatic soprano
 Pablo Kuri-Morales, Lebanese Mexican world health expert in pandemics
 Pilar Khoury (born 1994), Lebanese footballer
 Ken Khouri, Lebanese Jamaican pioneer record company owner and one of the first producers of reggae
 Makram Khoury, Israeli actor
 George Khoury, co-author and composer of No. 1 hit song "Sea of Love"
 Rabeeh Khoury, Israeli entrepreneur, founder of SolidRun
 Karyn Khoury, American award-winning perfumer
 Marwan Khoury, Lebanese singer, writer and composer
 Mario El-Khoury, Lebanese-Swiss engineer and business executive
 Muin J. Khoury, American geneticist and epidemiologist
 Paul Khoury, Australian television personality and leading TV Host in the poker arena
 Philip S. Khoury, Dean of the MIT School of Humanities, Arts, and Social Sciences from 1991 to 2006
 Raymond Khoury, Lebanese screenwriter and novelist, author of the 2006 New York Times bestseller The Last Templar
Rami George Khouri, journalist and editor with joint Palestinian-Jordanian and United States citizenship
 Said Khoury, Palestinian-Lebanese billionaire founder of Consolidated Contractors Company (CCC)
Sari Ibrahim Khoury, Palestinian-born 20th century abstract visual artist
 Theodore Khoury, Lebanese-born German Catholic theologian
 Justin Khoury, Lebanese American physicist and cosmology researcher who introduced the ekpyrotic universe
 Walter Hugo Khouri, Brazilian film director and producer of the film Men and Woman
 , Miss Lebanon 2011
 Zahi Khouri, Palestinian-American businessman, established Palestine National Beverage Company and PADICO
 Bechara El Khoury, first post-independence President of Lebanon
Stephanie Korey, founder and CEO of Away travel brand
 Robert J. Coury, Executive Chairman and former CEO of Mylan Labs
 Sylvia Khoury, American writer and playwright 
 Frederick Koury, founder of City-As-School High School
 Michael A. Khouri, Acting Chairman of the US Federal Maritime Commission
 Joseph S. Koury, Lebanese American real state developer, Koury Corporation
 Maurice J Koury, textile businessman and philanthropist

References

Arabic-language surnames